Grace Elizabeth Reid (born 9 May 1996) is a Scottish diver representing Scotland and Great Britain, and specialising in 1 metre and 3 metre springboard disciplines. She is a double gold medalist at both the European Championships and the Commonwealth Games, and a three-time national champion.

Career
At the 2010 Commonwealth Games, representing Scotland she competed in the Women's 3 metre springboard, aged only 14. At the 2014 Commonwealth Games, she competed in the Women's 1 metre springboard and Women's 3 metre springboard events. At her third Games, the 2018 Commonwealth Games held at Gold Coast, Reid won gold in the 1 metre springboard the first Scottish female diver to win a medal at the games. Four years later in Birmingham, paired with James Heatly she won her second Commonwealth title in the mixed 3 metre synchronised springboard event, came 4th in the women's 1 metre springboard event and 8th in the women's 3 metre springboard event.

Reid made her debut for Great Britain at the 2015 European Diving Championships. At the 2016 European Aquatics Championships she won Gold in the Mixed 3 m springboard synchro with partner Tom Daley. She also won Bronze in the Women's 3 m springboard becoming the first Scot  to win an individual European Championships diving medal for Great Britain since 1954.

Following Daley's decision to withdraw from all 2018 diving competitions, Reid partnered with Ross Haslam and the pair won the bronze medal at the 2018 FINA Diving World Cup, followed by silver at the 2018 European Championships.

Diving achievements

References

External links
 
 Grace Reid at Scottish Swimming (archived)
 
 
 
 
 
 
 
 
 

British female divers
Living people
1996 births
Sportspeople from Edinburgh
Divers at the 2010 Commonwealth Games
Divers at the 2014 Commonwealth Games
Divers at the 2016 Summer Olympics
Divers at the 2018 Commonwealth Games
Divers at the 2022 Commonwealth Games
Olympic divers of Great Britain
World Aquatics Championships medalists in diving
Commonwealth Games medallists in diving
Commonwealth Games gold medallists for Scotland
Divers at the 2020 Summer Olympics
Medallists at the 2018 Commonwealth Games
Medallists at the 2022 Commonwealth Games